Netty Kim (born December 22, 1976) is a Canadian former competitive figure skater. She is the 1995 Czech Skate bronze medallist and 1995 Canadian national champion.  She placed seventh at the 1992 World Junior Championships. She was coached by Bob Emerson and competed as a member of Upper Canada-North York Skating Club.

Results

References

Canadian female single skaters
Canadian sportspeople of Korean descent
Figure skaters from Toronto
1976 births
Living people
20th-century Canadian women